Bridgewater/Dayspring Airpark  is an aerodrome located  north of Bridgewater, Nova Scotia, Canada.

References

External links
Page about this airport on COPA's Places to Fly airport directory

Registered aerodromes in Nova Scotia
Bridgewater, Nova Scotia